Gull Island is a small island in the Churchill river in Labrador, in the Province of Newfoundland and Labrador, Canada. The Lower Churchill Project is expected to create a major dam in the area. Puffins are some of the animals that live on the Atlantic coast of Gull Island

Islands of Newfoundland and Labrador
Labrador